Triodia mlokossevitschi is a species of moth belonging to the family Hepialidae. It was described by Romanoff in 1884, and is known from Armenia.

References

External links
Hepialidae genera

Hepialidae
Moths described in 1884